Makan esmoh alwatan (in Arabic مكان اسمه الوطن) is an Egyptian 2006 documentary film.

Synopsis 
Four young Egyptians take different paths to find the place they can each call "home". Due to economic, religious or educational reasons, they are faced with difficulties that will force them to look for a way out through emigration or trying to live with the people that surround them.

Awards 
 Aljazeera Documentary FF 2006
 National Egyptian FF2006
 Rotterdam Arab FF 2006
 Ismailia FF 2006

External links 

2006 films
Egyptian documentary films
2006 documentary films